Strasser is a German surname. Notable people with the surname include:

Adolph Strasser (1843–1939), American trade union organizer
Alfred Strasser (born 1954), Swiss footballer
Anna Strasser (1921–2010), Austrian resistance activist
Benjamin Strasser (born 1987), German politician (FDP)
Bernd Strasser (born 1936), German water polo player
Chantal Strasser (born 1978), Swiss freestyle swimmer
Christoph Strasser (born 1982), Austrian ultra cyclist
Dave Strasser (born 1969), American mixed martial arts fighter
Erika Strasser (1934–2019), Austrian athlete
Ernst Strasser (born 1956), Austrian politician
Evi Strasser (born 1964), Canadian equestrian
Franz Strasser (1899–1945), Austrian-German politician and war criminal
Friedrich Strasser, Austrian painter
Gregor Strasser (1892–1934), German Nazi Party leader
Heinrich Strasser (born 1948), Austrian footballer
Hiltrud Strasser (born 1943), German veterinarian
Jeff Strasser (born 1974), Luxembourgian football player
Jonathan Strasser (1946–2017), American musician, educator, teacher, and conductor
Joseph C. Strasser (born 1940), United States Navy admiral
Leopold Strasser (1843–1908), American merchant, politician
Max Strasser (1904–1967), Swiss footballer
Peter Strasser (1876–1918), Imperial German Navy officer, commander of the German naval Zeppelin fleet in World War I
Peter Strasser (born 1969), German chemist
Peter G. Strasser, American attorney
Pirmin Strasser (born 1990), Austrian footballer
Raymond Strasser (born 1930), Luxembourgian wrestler
Robin Strasser (born 1945), American actress
Rodney Strasser (born 1990), Sierra Leonean footballer
Otto Strasser (1897–1974), German Nazi Party leader and exiled activist
Teresa Strasser (born 1950), American journalist and television personality
Todd Strasser (born 1950), American writer
Valentine Strasser (born 1967), Sierra Leonean politician

See also 
 Strasserism, "left"-wing Nazi faction
 Strasser brothers, 1930s Nazi Party activists
 Strasser Scheme, British aviation initiative created by Charles Strasser

German toponymic surnames